Music as a Weapon is a series of concert tours created by the American metal band Disturbed. There have been seven editions of the tour, five in North America and two in Australasia. The name of the tour is from the lyrics of "Droppin' Plates" on Disturbed's first album, The Sickness.

Line-ups

Music as a Weapon (2001)
Disturbed
Drowning Pool
Adema
Stereomud
Systematic

Music as a Weapon II (2003)
Disturbed
Chevelle
Taproot
Ünloco

Music as a Weapon III (2006)
Disturbed
Stone Sour
Flyleaf
Nonpoint

Music as a Weapon: Australia and New Zealand (2008)
For a list of tour dates, see Indestructible Tour.
Disturbed
P.O.D.
Alter Bridge
Redline
Behind Crimson Eyes

Music as a Weapon IV (2009)
For a list of tour dates, see Indestructible Tour.
Disturbed
Killswitch Engage
Lacuna Coil
Chimaira
Suicide Silence
Spineshank
Crooked X
Bury Your Dead
Born of Osiris
After the Burial

Music as a Weapon V (2011)
For a list of tour dates, see Asylum Tour.
Disturbed
Korn
Sevendust
In This Moment
StillWell (second leg only)
This was the first time Music as a Weapon had co-headliners, Disturbed and Korn.

Music as a Weapon: Australia and New Zealand (2011)
For a list of tour dates, see Asylum Tour.
Disturbed
Trivium
As I Lay Dying
Forgiven Rival (Australian dates only)
 These Four Walls (NZ dates only)

Live albums

Music as a Weapon II

Music as a Weapon II was recorded as a live album and DVD, created by Disturbed. It was recorded at The Aragon in Chicago in 2003, and released in 2004. It contains Disturbed's cover of Metallica's "Fade to Black" and the previously unreleased song "Dehumanized". The DVD also contains Disturbed's video for their single "Liberate". This was Disturbed's last release with bass guitarist Steve Kmak. It was also Ünloco's final release before splitting up.

Track listing

Chart positions

References

2001 concert tours
2003 concert tours
2006 concert tours
2008 concert tours
2009 concert tours
2011 concert tours
Disturbed (band)